Mentor is an unincorporated community in Saline County, Kansas, United States.  As of the 2020 census, the population of the community and nearby areas was 101.  It is located south of Salina on Mentor Road.

History
Mentor was named by settlers who hailed from Mentor, Ohio.

Mentor had a post office between 1881 and 1995.

A railroad previously ran north–south through Mentor, but it was later abandoned.

Geography

Demographics

For statistical purposes, the United States Census Bureau has defined Mentor as a census-designated place (CDP). Also, this community is a part of the Salina micropolitan area.

Education
The community is served by Southeast of Saline USD 306 public school district.

References

Further reading

External links
 Saline County maps: Current, Historic, KDOT

Unincorporated communities in Saline County, Kansas
Unincorporated communities in Kansas
Salina, Kansas micropolitan area